Nowy Ostrów may refer to the following places:
Nowy Ostrów, Podlaskie Voivodeship (north-east Poland)
Nowy Ostrów, Kartuzy County in Pomeranian Voivodeship (north Poland)
Nowy Ostrów, Warmian-Masurian Voivodeship (north Poland)